Ruben Blommaert (born 5 March 1992) is a Belgian-born German pair skater. With his skating partner, Alisa Efimova, he is the 2022 Grand Prix of Espoo silver medalist.

He also holds Belgian citizenship and competed for Belgium in single skating until 2010. Blommaert began representing Germany after teaming up with Annabelle Prölß to compete in pairs. They won the 2013 Cup of Nice and the 2013 German national title. He and his next partner, Mari Vartmann, won four ISU Challenger Series medals and the 2015 Cup of Nice.  With Annika Hocke, Blommaert won silver medals at the 2017 CS Minsk-Arena Ice Star and 2017 International Cup of Nice and competed at the 2018 Winter Olympics. He competed for one season with Elena Pavlova.

Personal life 
Ruben Blommaert was born on 5 March 1992 in Bruges, Belgium. He became a German citizen on 1 July 2014 while retaining his Belgian citizenship. He has a twin brother, Sander, who dances with the Royal Ballet in London.

Career 
Blommaert began learning to skate in 1998. He competed for Belgium in single skating until 2010, appearing at the European Championships and Junior World Championships.

Partnership with Prölß 
Blommaert teamed up with Annabelle Prölß in October 2011. They won the junior pairs title at the 2012 German Junior Championships.

In 2012–13, Prölß/Blommaert made their Junior Grand Prix debut in Lake Placid, finishing 6th, and then placed 4th in Germany. They won gold medals in the junior events at the 2013 Ice Challenge and 2013 Bavarian Open. Prölß/Blommaert won gold in their senior national debut at the 2013 German Championships. They finished 7th at the 2013 World Junior Championships.

In 2013–14, Prölß/Blommaert debuted on the senior international level. After finishing 4th at their first two events, they took gold at the International Cup of Nice. They received their first senior Grand Prix assignment, the 2013 Trophée Éric Bompard, after France's Daria Popova / Bruno Massot withdrew.

Partnership with Vartmann 
In the 2015–16 season, Blommaert started skating with Mari Vartmann. They won the 2015 Cup of Nice. At the 2016 Europeans, they placed 4th in the short program, 8th in the free program and 8th overall.

Vartmann and Blommaert started the 2016–17 season on the Challenger Series, winning bronze at both Nebelhorn Trophy and Finlandia Trophy. On 10 January 2017, the Deutsche Eislauf-Union announced that the two had parted ways.

Partnership with Hocke 
Blommaert and Annika Hocke announced their partnership on 9 February 2017.  They competed at the 2018 Winter Olympics in Pyeongchang, South Korea, as well as at the 2018 and 2019 World Championships, before dissolving their partnership.

Partnership with Pavlova 

Blommaert announced in July 2019 that he had formed a new partnership with Russian pair skater Elena Pavlova.  Due to Pavlova's visa issues, they indicated they would initially have to split time training between Russia and Germany. The pair split after one season.

Partnership with Efimova 
Blommaert formed a new partnership with Alisa Efimova, who had previously competed with Alexander Korovin for Russia. They placed 2nd at the 2022 German Championships but were not allowed compete internationally until Efimova had been released by the Russian federation. They had their international debut at the 2022 Nebelhorn Trophy, where they placed 2nd.

Programs

Pairs with Efimova

Pairs with Pavlova

Pairs with Hocke

With Vartmann

With Prölß

Single skating

Competitive highlights 
GP: Grand Prix; CS: Challenger Series; JGP: Junior Grand Prix

Pairs with Efimova for Germany

Pairs with Pavlova for Germany

Pairs with Hocke for Germany

Pairs with Vartmann for Germany

Pairs with Prölß for Germany

Men's singles for Belgium

Detailed results

With Prölß

References

External links 

 
 
 
 
 
 

1992 births
Living people
Sportspeople from Bruges
Belgian male single skaters
German male pair skaters
Naturalized citizens of Germany
Belgian emigrants to Germany
Figure skaters at the 2018 Winter Olympics
Olympic figure skaters of Germany